The 2012 season was Daegu FC's tenth season in the K-League in South Korea. Daegu FC will be competing in K-League and Korean FA Cup.

Current squad

Out on loan

Transfer

In

Out

Coaching staff

Match results

K-League
All times are Korea Standard Time (KST) – UTC+9

League table

Results summary

Results by round

Korean FA Cup

Squad statistics

Appearances
Statistics accurate as of match played 27 June 2012

Goals and assists

Discipline

References

Daegu FC
2012